Matthew Thomas Hall (born July 23, 1993) is an American professional baseball pitcher for the Kansas City Monarchs of the American Association of Professional Baseball. He played college baseball for Missouri State University. The Detroit Tigers selected Hall in the sixth round of the 2015 MLB draft. He has played in MLB for the Tigers and the Boston Red Sox.

Career

Amateur career
Hall attended Lee's Summit West High School in Lee's Summit, Missouri. He then attended  Missouri State University, where he played college baseball for the Missouri State Bears. Hall played collegiate summer baseball in 2014 for the Falmouth Commodores of the Cape Cod Baseball League, where he was named a league all-star. On May 5, 2015, the National Collegiate Baseball Writers Association named Hall their NCAA Division I Pitcher of the Week. Collegiate Baseball named him a First-Team All-American after the 2015 season.

Professional career

Detroit Tigers

The Detroit Tigers selected Hall in the sixth round of the 2015 MLB draft. After he signed, he pitched for the Connecticut Tigers of the Class A-Short Season New York-Penn League. In 2016, he pitched for the West Michigan Whitecaps of the Class A Midwest League. He began the 2017 season with the Lakeland Flying Tigers of the Class A-Advanced Florida State League, and was promoted to the Erie SeaWolves of the Class AA Eastern League in August.

In 2018, Hall began working as a relief pitcher for Erie. On July 9, he was named the Eastern League's Pitcher of the Week. The next day, the Tigers promoted him to the Toledo Mud Hens of the Class AAA International League. Hall was named the Tigers Minor League Pitcher of the Year. In 37 combined appearances between Erie and Toledo, he posted a 2.13 ERA and 1.085 WHIP, with 135 strikeouts in  innings. He had his contract purchased and was promoted to the major leagues on September 11, 2018, as a September call-up. He made his major league debut for the Tigers on September 15 in a game against the Cleveland Indians, where he pitched one inning, allowing eight hits, one walk and nine runs, six of which were earned. Hall made a total of five appearances with the 2018 Tigers, recording a 14.63 ERA while striking out five batters in eight innings pitched. During the 2019 season, Hall split time between Toledo and Detroit. With the 2019 Tigers he made 16 appearances, compiling an 0–1 record with 7.71 ERA and 27 strikeouts in  innings.

Boston Red Sox
On January 17, 2020, Hall was traded to the Boston Red Sox in exchange for minor league catcher Jhon Nuñez. Red Sox general manager Chaim Bloom believed in Hall, who at the time of the trade had given up 33 earned runs in 31 1/3 innings. On March 26, the team optioned Hall to the Class A-Advanced Salem Red Sox. He was added to Boston's active roster for the delayed start of the  season, and made his first major league start in the team's fifth game, pitching on July 28 against the New York Mets and taking the loss. He was optioned to the Red Sox' alternate training site on August 6, and called-up three times during September. Overall with the 2020 Red Sox, Hall appeared in four games (one start), compiling an 0–3 record with 18.69 ERA and 9 strikeouts in  innings pitched. On November 20, 2020, Hall was designated for assignment, and assigned outright to Triple-A Pawtucket five days later, with Bloom continuing to see promise in Hall and giving him another chance. He was released on August 16, 2021.

Kansas City Monarchs
On August 22, 2021, Hall signed with the Kansas City Monarchs of the American Association of Professional Baseball. In 2021, Hall recorded a 2-0 record and 0.75 ERA in 3 appearances with the Monarchs. On April 15, 2022, Hall re-signed with the Monarchs for the 2022 season. In 2022, Hall recorded a 4-1 record and 1.29 ERA in 5 appearances with the Monarchs.

San Francisco Giants
On June 12, 2022, Hall signed a minor league contract with the San Francisco Giants organization. He was released on July 4, 2022.

Kansas City Monarchs (second stint)
On July 14, 2022, Hall signed with the Kansas City Monarchs of the American Association of Professional Baseball.

References

External links

1993 births
Living people
Baseball players from Missouri
Boston Red Sox players
Connecticut Tigers players
Detroit Tigers players
Erie SeaWolves players
Falmouth Commodores players
Gulf Coast Tigers players
Lakeland Flying Tigers players
Major League Baseball pitchers
Missouri State Bears baseball players
Sportspeople from Independence, Missouri
Toledo Mud Hens players
West Michigan Whitecaps players
Worcester Red Sox players